Jean-Marie Tarascon FRSC (born September 21, 1953) is Professor of Chemistry at the Collège de France in Paris and Director of the French Research Network on Electrochemical Energy Storage (RS2E).

Education
Tarascon was educated at the University of Bordeaux, where he was awarded a Diplôme d'études universitaires générales in physics and chemistry, a Master of Science degree in chemical engineering, and a PhD in solid-state chemistry in 1981.

Career
Following his PhD, Tarascon did postdoctoral research at Cornell University. He worked at Bell Labs and Bellcore from 1982 to 1994, then moved to the University of Picardie Jules Verne in 1994. He has been at the College de France since 2010. He is also credited with laying foundations of the reputable Erasmus mundus masters course in energy storage and conversion "Materials for energy storage and conversion" hosted by UPJV, Amiens in association with seven universities across the globe and several energy research networks.

Research
Tarascon's research investigates the synthesis of novel electronic phenomena and materials such as superconductors, ferroelectrics, fluoride glasses, rechargeable batteries and colossal magnetoresistance. He has made many contributions to superconductivity and was the original proponent of the thin and flexible plastic lithium ion battery.

Awards and honours
Tarascon was elected a Foreign Member of the Royal Society (ForMemRS) in 2014. His nomination reads:

Tarascon was honoured by the New Jersey Inventors Hall of Fame in 2002. He was nominated to the Académie des Sciences in 2005, and was the University of Picardie Jules Verne (UPJV) gold medalist in 2008. He won the ENI Protection of the Environment award in 2011. In 2015 he was awarded the Royal Society of Chemistry's Centenary Prize. In 2017, he was one of the two winners of the Eric and Sheila Samson Prime Minister's Prize for Innovation in Alternative Fuels for Transportation. He was one of the five nominated for the CNRS Innovation Medals. In 2020 he received the Balzan Prize for Environmental Challenges: Materials Science for Renewable Energy.

References

External links
 Jean-Marie Tarascon's research group

Chevaliers of the Légion d'honneur
Living people
Foreign Members of the Royal Society
Members of the French Academy of Sciences
Fellows of the Royal Society of Chemistry
20th-century French chemists
21st-century French chemists
University of Bordeaux alumni
1953 births
French materials scientists
French chemists
Inorganic chemists
Solid state chemists